Charles E. Cowdrey (November 16, 1933 – January 18, 2011) was an American football coach.  Cowdrey served as a head high school coach for nine years, head coach at Fort Scott Community College for three years, assistant coach at University of Missouri for eight years, head coach at Illinois State University for four years, assistant coach at Drake University for one year, and head coach at Southwestern College for nine years. His overall record as a head coach including high school coaching is 138 wins, 85 losses, 6 ties, and as a college head coach he achieved a record of 81 wins, 86 losses, and 4 ties.

Early life
Cowdrey was born in Camden Point, Missouri, received a bachelor's degree in physical education from Northwest Missouri State University and a master's degree from the University of Missouri.

Cowdrey began his career as a coach at Smithville High School from 1957 to 1966.  He then at Fort Scott Community College from 1966 to 1969 and then was an assistant coach the University of Missouri from 1969 to 1977.

Coaching career

Illinois State
Cowdrey was the 16th head football coach for the Illinois State Redbirds in Normal, Illinois, and he held that position for four seasons, from 1977 until 1980.  His overall coaching record at ISU was 12 wins, 31 losses, and 1 tie.  This ranks him 11th at ISU in terms of total wins and 17th at ISU in terms of winning percentage.

Charlie Cowdrey became perhaps the only football coach in NCAA history to be fired less than 24 hours after his team had scored a major upset.

Southwestern College
From 1983 to 1991, he was the 23rd head coach for the Southwestern College Moundbuilders in Winfield, Kansas, where he compiled a record of 59 wins and 34 losses with 1 tie, taking over the program from famed football coach Dennis Franchione.  He held the position for nine season and became the 7th most successful coach at Southwestern College in terms of winning percentage (65.2%) and second in terms of total number of wins with 59.

Cowdrey took his teams to two separate bowl games, coaching half of the post-season bowls in school history.  Both appearances were in the Sunflower Bowl, and the team lost both times.  But 1984 was the first year that Southwestern qualified for the NAIA Football National Championship.  The first round the team defeated conference rival Bethel 17–14, and then lost to Northwestern College by a score of 45-23.

About being fired from the post, his son Bruce Cowdrey (also a football coach) related this story:

"A long time ago, my dad, Charlie Cowdrey (former Illinois State coach) was coaching Southwestern College in Winfield, Kan., when I asked him how he felt about being fired, ... he said, ‘When I came here, the first school president loved me. The second one didn't like football. The third one, he fired the chaplain. So I knew I was next.'"

Morningside College
After Southwestern, Cowdrey became the head coach at Morningside College in Sioux City, Iowa from 1993 through the 1995 season.  His teams at Morningside produce 5 wins, 26 losses, and 2 ties during his three years as head coach.

Death
Cowdrey died on January 18, 2011, at his home in Winfield.

Head coaching record

College

References

External links
 

1933 births
2011 deaths
Drake Bulldogs football coaches
Illinois State Redbirds football coaches
Missouri Tigers football coaches
Morningside Mustangs football coaches
Southwestern Moundbuilders football coaches
Fort Scott Greyhounds football coaches
High school football coaches in Kansas
High school football coaches in Missouri
Northwest Missouri State University alumni
University of Missouri alumni
University of Missouri faculty
People from Platte County, Missouri